Gunnar Strømvad (12 May 1908 – 6 December 1972) was a Danish film actor. He appeared in 34 films between 1940 and 1971.

Filmography

 Den forsvundne fuldmægtig (1971)
 Olsen-banden i Jylland (1971)
 Ballade på Christianshavn (1971)
 Rend mig i revolutionen (1970)
 Ta' lidt solskin (1969)
 Klabautermannen (1969)
 Farlig sommer (1969)
 Stine og drengene (1969)
 Romulus den store (1969)
 Olsen-banden (1968)
 Krybskytterne på Næsbygård (1966)
 Slap af, Frede! (1966)
 Strike First Freddy (1965)
 Don Olsen kommer til byen (1964)
 Tine (1964)
 Døden kommer til middag (1964)
 Støv for alle pengene (1963)
 Bussen (1963)
 Pigen og pressefotografen (1963)
 Det tossede paradis (1962)
 Sorte Shara (1961)
 To skøre ho'der (1961)
 Skibet er ladet med (1960)
 Den sidste vinter (1960)
 Tro, håb og trolddom (1960)
 Pigen i søgelyset (1959)
 Karen, Maren og Mette (1954)
 Jan går til filmen (1954)
 Kongeligt besøg (1954)
 Nålen (1951)
 For frihed og ret (1949)
 Kampen mod uretten (1949)
 Natekspressen P903 (1942)
 Jens Langkniv (1940)

External links

1908 births
1972 deaths
Danish male film actors
People from Odense
20th-century Danish male actors